St Giles' Church, Cropwell Bishop, is a Church of England parish church in the village of Cropwell Bishop, Nottinghamshire, England. The building is Grade I listed by the Department for Digital, Culture, Media and Sport as of outstanding architectural interest.

History
The church has 13th-century arcades, but it is mainly from the 14th century. It has a nave, north and south aisles, a south porch, a chancel and a tower. The tower, built about 1450, now contains six bells. One is from the 16th century, two are dated 1669 and 1757, a fourth was recast in 1905, and a fifth was added in the same year. A sixth, the treble bell, was installed in 1981.

From 1694 to 1906, the church had a clock by Richard Roe. This is now preserved in Nottingham Industrial Museum.

Current parish status
St Giles' Church, Cropwell Bishop, is in the Wiverton group of parishes, which includes:
St Andrew's Church, Langar
All Saints' Church, Granby
Holy Trinity Church, Tythby
St John's Church, Colston Bassett
St Mary's Church, Barnstone (not currently in use)
St Michael and All Angels' Church, Elton on the Hill

The incumbency is currently vacant.

Source
Clare Hartwell, Nikolaus Pevsner and Elizabeth Williamson: The Buildings of England, Nottinghamshire, Yale University Press, 2020

References

Church of England church buildings in Nottinghamshire
14th-century church buildings in England
Grade I listed churches in Nottinghamshire
Diocese of Southwell and Nottingham